Yeouinaru Station is a station on the Seoul Subway Line 5.

Station layout

Vicinity
Exit 1 : Yeouido Park
Exit 2 : Mapo Bridge (south end)
Exit 3 : Wonhyo Bridge (south end)
Exit 4 : MBC Headquarters, Yeouido Elementary, Middle, High and Girls' High Schools

References

Railway stations opened in 1996
Seoul Metropolitan Subway stations
Yeouido
Metro stations in Yeongdeungpo District
1996 establishments in South Korea
20th-century architecture in South Korea